Typhinellus bicolor is a species of sea snail, a marine gastropod mollusk in the family Muricidae, the murex snails or rock snails.

Description
The length of the shell attains 21 mm.

Distribution
This marine species occurs off Madagascar, Morocco and Turkey.

References

 Bozzetti, L. (2007). Quattro nuovi muricidi (Gastropoda: Hypsogastropoda: Muricidae: Muricopsinae, Coralliophilinae, Typhinae) dal Madagascar meridionale. Malacologia Mostra Mondiale. 19(57): 6-10.
 Bozzetti, L. (2007). Quattro nuovi muricidi (Gastropoda: Hypsogastropoda: Muricidae: Muricopsinae, Coralliophilinae, Typhinae) dal Madagascar meridionale. Malacologia Mostra Mondiale. 19(57): 6-10.

Typhinellus
Gastropods described in 2007